Syed Iqbal Zaheer (born in 1944) is an Indian Islamic scholar and writer. By profession he is an engineer. He was trained in Islamic disciplines by traditional scholars. He has proficiency in three languages: English, Arabic and Urdu. A polymath, and a prolific writer, he has wide interests and can freely write – journalistically – on advanced scientific topics such as cellular biology, quantum physics, or conundrums faced by the scientists in astrophysics. An interesting feature of his writings – apart from the fact that he writes on subjects not dealt by many – is that, in each of his book he adopts a new style of writing.

He has been editing the monthly magazine Young Muslim Digest (issued from Bangalore) since last 35 years in which his editorials and answers to the letters by the readers are followed with interest in several countries.

Literary work

Syed Iqbal Zaheer is also the author of several books:

Islam: The Religion You Can No Longer Ignore 
This book is all about the introduction of Islam. This book deals with the readers relationship with God.

Fake Pearls 
It is a collection of fabricated prophetic sayings. This work – collected from five different books – is a short collection of such reports as falsely attributed to Muhammad, and which have somehow been popular among the masses through the centuries.

A Short History of Israel 
With introduction by Abul Hasan Ali Nadwi, it presents the history of the Jews from the Abraham times until the end of the last century.

Bilal, the Abyssinian Out runner 
It is about the life of Bilal written in a story style, but within the parameters of historical evidences.

Muhammad the Unlettered Prophet Who Changed the World in 23 years 
A short biography of Muhammad.

An Educational encyclopedia of Islam 
This two volume Islamic Encyclopedia  which consists of 1300 pages is covering all the aspects of Islam in depth. It is written in very simple language. Though basically intended for use as a school text book, the encyclopedia is also an ideal tool for home schooling involving both the parents and the children.

Abul Hasan Ali Nadwi 
It is a biography of Syed Abul Hasan Ali al-Nadwi in 110 pages.

Fundamentals of the Islamic Creed 
The book is a summary of the faiths and beliefs of the Ahl al-Sunnah wa al-Jama’ah, the mainstream Muslim

A Voice to Hear 
Many non-Muslims wish to know what the Qur'an is about, but are not sure if they should procure a copy. These passages should give them some idea of the central theme of the Qur'anic message: Man’s creation by God, sending of Prophets, destruction of the world, raising up of the dead, accounting and judgment.

Tafsir Ishraq al-Ma`ani 
In 8 volumes, some 3500 pages Presents opinions of scholars of first few generations, and majority opinions of the commentators throughout Muslim history, with the provision that such opinions do not contradict a meaning given out by the majority of the Salaf.

Lectures and Dars
His weekly Qur'anic Dars and lectures are fairly well attended by the educated class. But, following the fatwa of classical Deoband scholars, he does not allow filming of his talks, does not believe in globe-trotting, and strongly objects to any praise directed at him as he believes that men who deserved praise are in their graves.

Social work
He runs an Islamic Institute for Girls teenage and older in the town of Hassan near Bangalore, whose syllabus emphasizes the Arabic language.

References

1944 births
Living people